Géraud is a given name. Notable people with the name include:

Géraud-Pierre-Henri-Julien Bessières (1777–1840), French scientist and diplomat
Géraud de Cordemoy (1626–1684), French philosopher, historian and lawyer
Géraud Duroc (1772–1813), French general noted for his association with Napoleon
Pierre Géraud-Keraod (1917–1997), one of the founders of the Bleimor Scouting movement in 1946
Géraud Michel de Pierredon (1916–2006), the Ambassador of the Order of Malta to France
Géraud du Puy (died 1420), French Roman Catholic bishop of Montauban, Saint-Flour, Mende and Carcassonne
Géraud Réveilhac (1851–1937), French career officer, Général de division during World War I
Jules-Géraud Saliège (1870–1956), French Cardinal of the Roman Catholic Church
Géraud Sénizergues (born 1957), French computer scientist at the University of Bordeaux

See also
La Chapelle-Saint-Géraud, commune in the Corrèze department in central France
Saint-Géraud, commune in the Lot-et-Garonne department in south-western France
Saint-Géraud-de-Corps, commune in the Dordogne department in Aquitaine in southwestern France
Gérard given name page